Roje is a settlement north of Šentjernej in southeastern Slovenia. The municipality is part of the traditional region of Lower Carniola. It is now included in the Southeast Slovenia Statistical Region.

Archaeological excavations in the settlement in the early 1960s revealed two Roman graves, part of a small local cemetery.

References

External links
Roje on Geopedia

Populated places in the Municipality of Šentjernej